Finnmark County Municipality was the regional governing administration for the old Finnmark county in Norway. It was dissolved on 31 December 2019 when Finnmark county was merged into Troms og Finnmark county starting on 1 January 2020. The administration was located in the town of Vadsø and was led by a county council.  The last mayor of the county was Runar Sjåstad from 2007 until 2019.

Since 1975, the county council of Finnmark was a democratically elected body with a wide range of responsibilities for the whole county. These responsibilities included economic and social development, construction and maintenance of county roads, upper secondary education, dental services, and cultural services.  In performing its tasks, the county administration worked closely with the municipalities of Finnmark as well as other public institutions. Elections for the county council were held every four years, simultaneously with the municipal elections.

County government
The Finnmark county council was made up of 31 representatives that were elected every four years. The council essentially acted as a Parliament or legislative body for the county. The council was led by a county mayor.

County council
The party breakdown of the final council was as follows:

References

 
County Municipality
County municipalities of Norway
Organisations based in Finnmark
1838 establishments in Norway
2020 disestablishments in Norway